Leonardo "Léo" Porto Siqueira (born 3 April 1986) is a Brazilian football manager. He is the current assistant manager of Fortaleza.

Career
Born in Santa Maria, Rio Grande do Sul, Porto was a futsal player before retiring and starting a physical education degree in São Paulo. He started his career at Juventus-SP's under-15 squad before joining Hélio dos Anjos' assistant at Fortaleza in 2013, as an analyst and assistant.

After working with Hélio dos Anjos at Atlético Goianiense, Porto joined Dorival Júnior's staff at Santos in November 2015, as an analyst. He subsequently worked in the same role with Dorival at São Paulo, Flamengo and Athletico Paranaense.

On 23 December 2020, Porto returned to Fortaleza as a permanent assistant manager of the club. In April 2021,  after the dismissal of Enderson Moreira, he was named interim manager.

Porto's first match in charge of the Leão occurred on 1 May 2021, a 4–1 Campeonato Cearense home success over Caucaia. He returned to his previous role three days later, after the appointment of Juan Pablo Vojvoda.

References

External links

1974 births
Living people
People from Santa Maria, Rio Grande do Sul
Brazilian football managers
Santos FC non-playing staff
Fortaleza Esporte Clube managers
Sportspeople from Rio Grande do Sul